Bantubonke Harrington Holomisa (born 25 July 1955) is a South African Member of Parliament and President of the United Democratic Movement.

Holomisa was born in Mqanduli, Cape Province. He joined the Transkei Defence Force in 1976 and had become a brigadier by 1985.

Holomisa forced the resignation and exile of Prime Minister of Transkei George Matanzima in October 1987 and overthrew Matanzima's successor, Prime Minister Stella Sigcau in a bloodless coup d'état in December 1987. Holomisa then became the head of government of Transkei from 1987 to 1994, upon which Transkei was reintegrated into the "new" South Africa and Holomisa joined the African National Congress (ANC).

National politics 
In 1994 Holomisa was elected to the National Executive Committee of the African National Congress, and was the Deputy Minister of Environment and Tourism of South Africa.

Expulsion from the ANC 
Holomisa testified to the Truth and Reconciliation Commission that Stella Sigcau should be investigated for corruption. Holomisa stated that Sigcau was involved in accepting bribes from South African hotel and casino magnate Sol Kerzner when she was minister of public enterprises in the Transkei government of George Matanzima. Instead of investigating the accusations of corruption the ANC accused Holomisa of bringing the party into disrepute. Holomisa then also accused the ANC of also accepting funds and kickbacks from Kerzner.  The ANC then expelled Holomisa on 30 September 1996. Deputy president Thabo Mbeki was instrumental in pushing for Holomisa's expulsion and recommended that there was no need to investigate Sigcau for corruption even though the circumstances of Sigcau accepting money from Kerzner were not in doubt.

Founding of the UDM 
Holomisa co-founded the United Democratic Movement (UDM) in 1997 with former ANC executive member John Taylor and Roelf Meyer, and was elected to parliament in 1999.

Holomisa and the UDM supported a motion of no confidence in President Jacob Zuma on several occasions, including on 8 August 2017.

Personal life 

Holomisa supports South African football club Kaizer Chiefs, for whom he declared his love in an interview with Radio 702 in 2015.

References 

1955 births
Living people
People from King Sabata Dalindyebo Local Municipality
Xhosa people
African National Congress politicians
United Democratic Movement (South Africa) politicians
Members of the National Assembly of South Africa
Heads of government of Transkei
Leaders who took power by coup
South African military personnel